Diari de Tarragona is a Spanish language newspaper, with some articles in Catalan.  Based in the province of Tarragona, they are focused on proving the area with local and provincial news. They were originally founded in 1939 with the name Diario Español only a few weeks before the end of the Spanish Civil War.

History 
The newspaper published its first issue on 17 January 1939, in the middle of the Civil War, shortly after Tarragona was occupied by the Franquistas. Their first director was Luis Climent, who held the position from 1939 to 1942.

During the Dictatorship, the newspaper formed part of the Cadena de Prensa del Movimiento. After Franco's death, they joined the public body Medios de Comunicación Social del Estado (MCSE). In 1984, they were auctioned off by the State and sold. Following this, they changed their name to Diari de Tarragona.

References

Bibliography

External links 
 Online edition of Diari de Tarragona

20th century in Catalonia
21st century in Catalonia
Catalan-language newspapers
Newspapers established in 1939
Tarragona
Spanish-language newspapers
1939 establishments in Spain